Kenneth Hahn State Recreation Area, or Kenneth Hahn Park, is a state park unit of California in the Baldwin Hills Mountains of Los Angeles. The park is managed by the Los Angeles County Department of Parks and Recreation. As one of the largest urban parks and regional open spaces in the Greater Los Angeles Area, many have called it "L.A.'s Central Park". The  park was established in 1984.

“Few Southern Californians seem to know about a park in Baldwin Hills, but the clean, well-developed park is no secret to nearby residents, who enjoy weekend picnics and barbecues on the expansive lawns,” wrote the Los Angeles Times in 1988.

Recreation

Hahn Park offers walking and hiking trails with some of the area's best scenic vistas.
North to the Hollywood Sign
East to the Downtown Los Angeles high-rises and San Gabriel Mountains behind them
Southeast to the Santa Ana Mountains
South to the Los Angeles Harbor area
Southwest to Santa Monica Bay, Los Angeles International Airport, and the Pacific Ocean
West to the Santa Monica Mountains

The park is a destination for picnics and family gatherings, having 100 picnic tables in various picnic grounds around the park. The park also has four playgrounds, a half basketball court, a multi-purpose field, and a sand volleyball court. Garden areas include a Japanese garden with a lotus pond and waterfall. In 2017, a 9-hole disc golf course was added along the north bowl.

There are six sets of bathrooms for visitors. Restrooms are locked at 5:30 p.m. daily.

Lake
There is a lake for fishing, stocked monthly with trout or catfish, depending on the weather season.

Since 2004, the park, primarily the bowl, has been the site of the Southern California USATF Cross Country Championships.

Trails
There are at least  of walking paths through the park. LA County Trails app for Android and iPhone has detailed maps and route guides.

 Burke Roche Trail, 
 Rim Trail 
 Bowl Loop, 
 Ridge trail, 
 Waterfall Trail, 
 Ballfield Walking Path,

Entrance fee
Admission is charged for cars entering the park on weekends and holidays only (weekdays free). Transferable annual passes are available.

Day rates are $7 per car or $5 for seniors over 65 or disabled with handicapped placard.

There is no charge to visitors using transit or hikers and cyclists entering the park. The county operates a circuit bus that visits the park every half hour on weekends and holidays, and a map of nearby bus routes and bike paths is available.

Kenneth Hahn SRA is one of the few California State Parks that does not accept the “annual day use pass.”

Ecology
The park is currently home to urban coyotes, California ground squirrel, elusive gray foxes, raccoons, striped skunk, desert cottontail rabbits, opossums, and California quail, among other animals.

“Hummingbirds, hawks, northern mockingbirds and blue scrub-jays flock to Kenneth Hahn State Recreation Area,” and the park is a nexus for the Black Birders movement. The Baldwin Hills area is the nesting grounds for 41 species of birds, and the Audubon Society offers monthly birdwatching walks.

The park is immediately adjacent to the  Inglewood Oil Field, which, when combined with the parkland, provides an unusually large habit range for Los Angeles urban wildlife. Kenneth Hahn and adjacent Baldwin Hills parks host four species of snakes: gopher snake, California kingsnake, ring-necked snake and red coachwhip. Warning signs to the contrary, rattlesnakes “don’t fare well in urban areas” and there are no rattlesnakes in the Baldwin Hills at this time. 

The park's native habitat is the Coastal sage scrub plant community, with oak woodlands in northern arroyos and bunch grass grasslands on the southwestern windy and exposed terrain. Native plants present in the park include California sagebrush, coyote brush and prickly pear. Invasive species in the park include black mustard, castor bean, milk thistle, agave, ice plant, nasturtium, and lantana. 

“The native plant community has been greatly altered by the hand of man, so much so that botanists describe Baldwin Hills flora as being in a condition called disclimax,” reported the L.A. Times in 1988.

Olympic forest
To serve as a monument to Los Angeles’ role in the Olympic movement, 140 trees have been planted together on the hills where the 1932 Olympic Village was located, with each tree representing a nation that took part in the 1984 Summer Olympics in Los Angeles.

The Olympic Forest includes “sea hibiscus from Seychelles, oleander from Algeria, sweet bay from Greece, Cajeput from Papua New Guinea…the paper mulberry from Toga, the carob from Cyprus, the date palm from Egypt.”

History

The Hills 
The Baldwin Hills were part of the homeland of the Tongva people, inhabited by them for over 8,000 years. In the 19th century the area was part of the Spanish and Mexican Ranchos of California era, with the Rancho Rincon de los Bueyes and Rancho La Cienega o Paso de la Tijera in and around the present day park.  As Los Angeles quickly grew during the 20th century, only the rugged terrain of this section of the Baldwin Hills protected it from being developed.

In 1932 the area east of the park was used as the site of the first Olympic Village ever built, for the 1932 Summer Olympics in the 10th Olympiad, which Los Angeles hosted. 

Between 1947 and 1951 the Baldwin Hills Reservoir was built in the hills here. In 1963 the reservoir's dam collapsed disastrously, washing away residences in the canyon and flooding the landmark Baldwin Hills Village (now Village Green). The news coverage of the disaster was the first time aerial footage was televised live. Before the county demolished the ruined reservoir bowl and converted the land into parking and picnic areas circa 1990s, “Fennel, chamise and dandelion pushed through the cracked cement bottom of the reservoir” and it was overlooked by a “observation tower” that resembled “a castle from the Middle Ages.” 

The bowl of the reservoir (now called Janice’s Green Valley) has been planted with grass and trees but remains visible and is the site of a popular jogging track. 

In the late 1940s the city transportation master plan included building a new north-south freeway, the aborted Laurel Canyon Freeway-SR-170, that would have bisected the Baldwin Hills and park site where La Cienega Boulevard currently crosses the hills.

Park development 
Los Angeles County Supervisors began negotiations to acquire the site of the Baldwin Hills Dam disaster in 1976. In 1977 Los Angeles County Supervisor Kenneth Hahn convinced Vice President Walter Mondale to reuse the land, from former oil-drilling sites, for a public open space park.

At the time the area was also a very popular spot for the then-new sport of motocross, locals calling it “Motorcycle Hill.” An abandoned oil well at the top of the hill was decorated with sparkle lights during the holiday season and looked like a giant Christmas tree at night. 

The park is named after Los Angeles County Board of Supervisors member Kenneth Hahn, also the father of James Hahn, former Los Angeles mayor, and Janice Hahn, former  U.S. Representative and now one of the five County Supervisors. 

The Kenneth Hahn State Recreation Area first opened in 1983 as the Baldwin Hills State Recreational Area, and was later renamed in 1988 to honor Supervisor Hahn and his preservation efforts there. Also since its opening the park has been expanded, as some of the adjacent oil wells have “dried up” and the oil field land cleaned up and acquired.

The park is home to the Dr. Martin Luther King, Jr. Memorial Tree Grove.

The park, which is part of the greater Ballona Creek watershed, is now connected to nearby open spaces across La Cienega Blvd. via the Park to Playa Bridge. Hahn Park is a keystone segment of the Park to Playa Trail, completed 2020.

In popular culture
The park has been used as a filming location for films, television shows and videos; including: 
 HBO’s Insecure
Buffy the Vampire Slayer'''s musical episode "Once More, with Feeling"Mighty Morphin Power RangersThe golf scene in the film Swordfish, in the adjacent oil field
The park is mentioned in the song "The Ice Plant Amphitheater" by folk singer John Craigie
The park is featured in the video game Midnight Club: Los Angeles'' 
The music video for Dr. Dre and Snoop Dogg's "Nuthin' but a G Thang"

See also

List of California state parks
Park to Playa Trail

References

External links 

California State Parks.gov: Kenneth Hahn State Recreation Area 
Los Angeles County.info: Kenneth Hahn State Recreation Area 
California State Parks.gov: Baldwin Hills Scenic Overlook

California State Recreation Areas
Parks in Los Angeles
Parks in Los Angeles County, California
Baldwin Hills (mountain range)
Baldwin Hills, Los Angeles
1984 establishments in California
Protected areas established in 1984